The 1982 North Texas State Mean Green football team was an American football team that represented North Texas State University (now known as the University of North Texas) during the 1982 NCAA Division I-AA football season as a member of the Southland Conference. In their first year under head coach Corky Nelson, the team compiled a 2–9 record. Although a member of the Southland, North Texas was ineligible to compete for the conference championship in 1982.

Schedule

References

North Texas State
North Texas Mean Green football seasons
North Texas State Mean Green football